Juan Miguel Rando Gálvez (Santa Coloma de Gramenet, 26 March 1988) is a Spanish swimmer. At the 2012 Summer Olympics he finished 25th overall in the heats in the Men's 100 metre backstroke and failed to reach the semifinals.

References

External links

1988 births
Living people
Olympic swimmers of Spain
Swimmers at the 2012 Summer Olympics
Spanish male backstroke swimmers
Universiade medalists in swimming
Universiade silver medalists for Spain
Medalists at the 2011 Summer Universiade
Sportspeople from Santa Coloma de Gramenet